Brunerstown is an unincorporated community in Madison Township, Putnam County, in the U.S. state of Indiana.

History
Brunerstown was founded in 1837 by Joseph Bruner, and named for him. A post office was established at Brunerstown in 1839, and remained in operation until it was discontinued in 1859.

Geography

References

Unincorporated communities in Putnam County, Indiana
Unincorporated communities in Indiana